TrueAnon is an American politics podcast hosted by Brace Belden and Liz Franczak. The podcast focuses on left-wing analysis of political issues and events, particularly those concerning deceased financier and sex offender Jeffrey Epstein. The title of the podcast is a parodic reference to the QAnon conspiracy theory.

History and content
TrueAnon is hosted by Brace Belden, a left-wing internet personality notable for fighting with the People's Protection Units in the Syrian Civil War, and Liz Franczak, a writer for The Baffler and Deadspin. Belden and Franczak met in the early 2000s, through San Francisco's punk music scene. The hosts, who identify as Marxists, developed an interest in the Epstein case after Gawker published the contents of Epstein's personal address book in 2015, which established Epstein's connections to multiple influential figures in politics, finance, intelligence, academia, and entertainment.

Following Epstein's arrest in July 2019, Belden and Franczak noted how many of the details of the Epstein case, such as his connections to U.S. intelligence agencies, were not covered in the mainstream press. TrueAnon was thus conceived to explore how "the fascination with Epstein is part of a larger story about the rot at the heart of the global elite," and how this reveals "larger class antagonisms within the United States."

The first episode of TrueAnon was released on July 23, 2019. Branding itself as "the only non-pedophile podcast," TrueAnon combines elements of the true crime genre and the dirtbag left, the rhetorical style most closely associated with Chapo Trap House defined by "subversive, populist vulgarity." In addition to covering the Epstein case, TrueAnon devotes analysis and discussion to topics such as human trafficking, Medicare for All, Silicon Valley, academia, finance, and non-profit organizations. While TrueAnon covers material that has been described as conspiracy theory, Belden and Franczak assert that the podcast engages in historical materialism, focusing on "the power structures that produced Epstein in the first place" rather than a "fixed theory of Epstein’s death." Notable guests who have appeared on the podcast include Epstein accuser Maria Farmer, journalist Ken Klippenstein, and musician Azealia Banks.

During late 2021 the podcast covered the Ghislaine Maxwell trial daily from the courtroom, summarizing and discussing the days events in an episode for each day of the trial.

Episode guide 
As of May 2, 2022, 225 episodes of TrueAnon have been released.

Reception
TrueAnon has been positively received by critics. GQ described the podcast as possessing a "one-of-a-kind flair you won't get anywhere else," offering praise for the quality of the podcast's research. Journalist Jeet Heer cited TrueAnon as one of the few left-wing outlets to discuss the Epstein case in detail, compared to "the reluctance of the mainstream media to tackle the topic for fear of seeming conspiratorial." Journalist Glenn Greenwald has also offered praise for the podcast and its coverage of the 2016 Nevada caucus.

, TrueAnon is the eighth-ranked podcast on Patreon and the 10th ranked account on the site overall, as measured by number of patrons.

See also
 "Epstein didn't kill himself"
Political podcast

Notes

References

External links
 TrueAnon on iTunes
 
 

Crime podcasts
2019 podcast debuts
Socialist podcasts
Socialism in the United States
Patreon creators
2019 establishments in California
American podcasts
Jeffrey Epstein
QAnon